David Pfeffer (born 11 April 1982) is a German singer. He rose to fame during the second series of the German X Factor show, which he won in December 2011. David Pfeffer, who is also a police officer in Duisburg, Germany, released his debut album I Mind on 9 December 2011, which entered the German charts at No.20. The album, I Mind includes Pfeffer's single "I'm Here", which also was released on the same day as the album, 9 December 2011.

Career

2011: X Factor
Pfeffer auditioned for the second series of X Factor in 2011, singing The Fray's "You Found Me". He was mentored by Till Brönner and was announced the winner on 6 December 2011, winning a record deal with Sony Music.

Pfeffer's winning song, "I'm Here," was made available for download on 6 December 2011, followed by his debut album I Mind which was released three days later.

Personal life
Pfeffer was born in Dorsten, North Rhine-Westphalia, Germany. He has two siblings.

Discography

Studio albums

Singles

See also
X Factor (Germany season 2)

References

External links

 

1982 births
Living people
The X Factor winners
21st-century German  male singers